The Federation of Nepalese Journalists (FNJ) is a nationwide organization of journalists in Nepal. More than 13,000 media persons working in all areas of media (print, electronic and online) across the country are the member of FNJ. The headquarters of FNJ is located at Media Village, Tilganga Kathmandu.

References

External links
FNJ website

Trade unions in Nepal
Journalists' trade unions